Creepozoids is a 1987 American science fiction horror film, the first 35mm film directed by David DeCoteau, and starring Linnea Quigley, Ken Abraham, Michael Aranda, Richard S. Hawkins and Kim McKamy (also known as Ashlyn Gere). It was remade in 1997 as Hybrid.

Plot
Set in 1998, six years after an apocalyptic nuclear war, a group of five U.S. Army deserters take refuge from acid rain in a seemingly abandoned laboratory complex in the ruins of Los Angeles. They soon discover that the lab was a top-secret government research center, where a genetically-engineered monster still lurks.

Cast
 Linnea Quigley as Blanca 
 Ken Abraham as Butch
 Michael Aranda as Jesse
 Richard S. Hawkins as Jake
 Ashlyn Gere (credited as Kim McKamy) as Kate
 Joi Wilson as Woman

Production

In a 2001 interview, Director David DeCoteau, when asked about the movie's production, said 
"Creepozoids was shot in 15 days in a warehouse in Los Angeles. I think the budget was something like 150k. It was a difficult shoot because of all the FX and monster sequences. Lotsa slime and very ambitious. Linnea Quigley starred in it and we had a great time working together. It was my first feature shot in 35mm. It was theatrically released and a hit on video."

Cast member Ashlyn Gere was a noted pornographic film actress.

Reception

Critical reception for the film has been mostly negative. TV Guide awarded the film 1 star out of 4 calling it an Alien imitation.
Editor of Psychotronic Video, Michael Weldon, described the creature effects as "pretty bad", saying the baby monster at the film's end was the "only scary part".

Home media
The film was first released on DVD by Full Moon Home Video on December 9, 2003. Since then it has been released multiple times by different studios.

See also
 Shocking Dark

References

External links 
 
 

1987 horror films
1987 films
Empire International Pictures films
1980s monster movies
1980s science fiction horror films
American post-apocalyptic films
1980s English-language films
Films directed by David DeCoteau
Films scored by Guy Moon
Films set in 1998
Films set in the future
Films shot in Los Angeles
Films set in Los Angeles
1980s American films